The PA-20 Pacer and PA-22 Tri-Pacer, Caribbean, and Colt are an American family of light strut-braced high-wing monoplane aircraft built by Piper Aircraft from 1949 to 1964.

The Pacer is essentially a four-place version of the two-place PA-17 Vagabond, with conventional landing gear, a steel tube fuselage and an aluminum frame wing covered with fabric, much like Piper's famous Cub and Super Cub. The Tri-Pacer is a development of the Pacer with tricycle landing gear, while the Colt is a two-seat flight training version of the Tri-Pacer. Prized for their ruggedness, spacious cabins, and, for the time, impressive speed, many of these aircraft continue to fly today. 

Development
The Pacer and the Tri-Pacer were the first post-World War II Piper designs with flaps and a control yoke instead of a center stick, and they belong to a sub-group of Piper aircraft popularly called "short wing Pipers," reflecting their shorter wingspans compared to the earlier J-3 Cub and PA-18 Super Cub. The PA-20 Pacer is a tailwheel aircraft and thus has somewhat limited forward visibility on the ground and relatively demanding ground-handling characteristics. To help introduce more pilots to easier, safer flying, from February 1951, Piper introduced the PA-22 Tri-Pacer with a nosewheel instead of the tailwheel landing gear. At the time the tricycle undercarriage became a popular preference and 1953 saw the PA-22 Tri-Pacer outsell the Pacer by a ratio of six to one. Due to the geometry of the nosewheel installation, the aircraft is sometimes called the "Flying Milk Stool."

In 1959 and 1960 Piper offered a cheaper, less well-equipped version of the Tri-Pacer with a  Lycoming O-320 designated the PA-22-150 Caribbean. Over 9400 Tri-Pacers were produced between 1950 and 1964 when production ended, with 3280 still registered with the U.S. Federal Aviation Administration (FAA) in April 2018.

An unusual feature of the Tri-Pacer is bungees linking the ailerons and rudder to facilitate coordinated flight. The system can be easily overcome by the pilot as needed and allowed the installation of a simple Mitchell Industries transistorised autopilot marketed by Piper under the name Auto-control. It has roll and yaw data derived from a modified AN Direction Indicator and AN Gyro Horizon, boosted by a piggyback amplifier on the direction indicator driving a Globe Motors bi-directional motor/servo clamped to the top of the control column via the aileron control chains.

A trainer version of the PA-22 Tri-Pacer, the PA-22-108 Colt, was introduced to compete directly with other popular trainers such as the Cessna 150, and was powered by a  Lycoming O-235. Quickly designed in late 1960, the two-seat Colt was offered at a substantially lower price than the Tri-Pacer, and omitted the four-seat aircraft's flaps and second wing tank along with the rear side windows and door. The Colt otherwise closely resembles the Tri-Pacer, using the same front seats and door, landing gear, engine mounts, windshield, tail surfaces, struts and instrument panel. Over 2,000 Colts were manufactured and it was the last Pacer variant—and thus the last short wing Piper—to be dropped from production. 

The last batch of 12 PA-22-150s were built for the French Army in 1963 and the last of the family, a PA-22-108 Colt, was completed on 26 March 1964. The type was replaced on the Vero Beach production line by the PA-28 Cherokee 140.

Some PA-22s have been converted to a tailwheel configuration, resulting in an aircraft that is very similar to a PA-20 Pacer, but which retains the model refinements and features of the PA-22. These conversions are often referred to by owners as PA-22/20s and are often listed in classified aircraft ads as such, although officially such converted aircraft continue to be designated by the FAA as PA-22 Tri-Pacers. When this conversion is accomplished, a disc brake conversion is usually installed in place of the original drum brakes, and the Lycoming O-360 180 HP engine is the preferred upgrade.
Some PA-22s have a Hartzell constant-speed controllable propeller or Koppers Aeromatic propeller. Each of these installations improves performance and economy at the sacrifice of payload. A few Colts have also been converted to tailwheel configuration, although this is not as popular as converting Tri-Pacers.

Operational history

Cuba
Between 1953 and 1955, the Cuban Army Air Force (Fuerza Aérea Ejército de Cuba, or FAEC) received 7 PA-20s, 4 PA-22-150s, and 3 PA-22-160s.  During the Cuban Revolution, PA-22s had their rear-doors removed and a .30 caliber machine gun installed in its place for use against insurgents, along with hand-dropped grenades. A PA-22 providing ground support for the Cuban Army during the Battle of Guisa is believed to be the lone aircraft lost by the FAEC to enemy fire.

Katanga
During the Congo Crisis, Katangese separatists received five PA-22-150s from the South African Air Force for the Force aérienne katangaise which were deployed against ONUC forces between 1961 and 1963.

Variants
PA-20
Four seats, conventional landing gear,  Lycoming O-290-D engine. Certified 21 December 1949.
PA-20S
Three seats, conventional landing gear, optional float installation,  Lycoming O-290-D engine. Certified 18 May 1950.
PA-20 115
Four seats, conventional landing gear,  Lycoming O-235-C1 engine. Certified 22 March 1950.
PA-20S 115
Three-seat, conventional landing gear, optional float installation,  Lycoming O-235-C1 engine. Certified 18 May 1950.
PA-20 135
Four seats, conventional landing gear,  Lycoming O-290-D2 engine. Certified 5 May 1952.
PA-20S 135
Three seats, conventional landing gear, optional float installation,  Lycoming O-290-D2 engine. Certified 15 May 1952.
PA-22
Four seats, tricycle landing gear,  Lycoming O-290-D engine. Certified 20 December 1950.
PA-22-108 Colt
Two seats, tricycle landing gear,  Lycoming O-235-C1 or C1B engine. Certified 21 October 1960.
PA-22-135
Four seats, tricycle landing gear,  Lycoming O-290-D2 engine. Certified 5 May 1952.
PA-22S-135
Three seats, tricycle landing gear, optional float installation,  Lycoming O-290-D2 engine. Certified 14 May 1954.

PA-22-150
Two or four seats, tricycle landing gear,  Lycoming O-320-A2A or A2B engine. Certified 3 September 1952 as a four place in the normal category and 24 May 1957 as a two place in the utility category.
PA-22-150 Caribbean
PA-22S-150
Three seats, tricycle landing gear, optional float installation,  Lycoming O-320-A2A or A2B engine. Certified 3 September 1954.
PA-22-160
Two or four seats, tricycle landing gear,  Lycoming O-320-B2A or B2B engine. Certified 3 September 1952 as a four place in the normal category and as a two place in the utility category.
PA-22S-160
Three seats, tricycle landing gear, optional float installation,  Lycoming O-320-B2A or B2B engine. Certified 25 October 1957.

Specifications (1958 PA-22-160 Tri-Pacer)

See also

References

Citations

Bibliography

High-wing aircraft
Single-engined tractor aircraft
Pacer
1940s United States civil utility aircraft
Aircraft first flown in 1949